Madelina Fleuriot (born 28 October 2003) is a Haitian footballer who plays as a goalkeeper for Exafoot and the Haiti women's national team.

Career
Fleuriot was a member of the Haiti under-20 national team at the 2018 FIFA U-20 Women's World Cup, the team's first ever major women's international tournament, but did not make an appearance. She has appeared for the senior Haiti national team, including in the 2020 CONCACAF Women's Olympic Qualifying Championship qualification against Puerto Rico on 7 October 2019, which finished as a 2–1 win.

References

External links
 
 
 

2003 births
Living people
Women's association football goalkeepers
Haitian women's footballers
People from Ouest (department)
Haiti women's international footballers